The Murban Bab Oil Field is an oil field in Abu Dhabi. It was discovered in 1953 and developed by Abu Dhabi National Oil Company. The oil field is operated and owned by Abu Dhabi National Oil Company.

References 

Oil fields of the United Arab Emirates